The 2002 Rally Catalunya (formally the 38th Rallye Catalunya - Costa Brava) was the fourth round of the 2002 World Rally Championship. The race was held over three days between 22 March and 24 March 2002, and was won by Peugeot's Gilles Panizzi, his 5th win in the World Rally Championship.

Background

Entry list

Itinerary
All dates and times are CET (UTC+1).

Results

Overall

World Rally Cars

Classification

Special stages

Championship standings

Junior World Rally Championship

Classification

Special stages

Championship standings

References

External links 
 Official website of the World Rally Championship

Rally Catalunya
Rally Catalunya